The list of ship decommissionings in 1991 includes a chronological list of all ships decommissioned in 1991.


See also 

1991
 Ship decommissionings
Ship